Dalla guerra amorosa (HWV 102) is a secular chamber cantata for either bass (HWV 102a) or soprano (HWV 102b) written by Georg Frideric Handel in Italy during 1708–9. Other catalogues of Handel's music have referred to the work as HG l,34; (there is no HHA numbering). The title of the cantata roughly translates as "From the war of amorous passion".

Dalla guerra amorosa, is thought to be among the works written for Francesco Maria Marescotti Ruspoli, 1st Prince of Cerveteri, as the manuscript source is a copy made for Ruspoli in August 1709.  This work is delicate and even poignant –  the aria to the fading of beauty, La bellezza è come un fiore, is reminiscent of Come rosa in su la spina in Apollo e Dafne.  The cantata has a refrain (Fuggite, sì fuggite) which is also reflected in the music, and ends with a delightful arioso following the last refrain.

A typical performance lasts between 8 and 11 minutes.

Movements 

The work has five movements:

(Movements do not contain repeat markings unless indicated. The number of bars is the raw number in the manuscript—not including repeat markings. The above is taken from the Händel-Gesellschaft edition (volume 50, page 34).

See also
 List of cantatas by George Frideric Handel

References

External links
 Text and midi samples

Cantatas by George Frideric Handel
1709 compositions